The 1955 Michigan State Normal Hurons football team represented Michigan State Normal College (renamed Eastern Michigan College in 1956) in the Interstate Intercollegiate Athletic Conference (IIAC) during the 1955 college football season. In their fourth season under head coach Fred Trosko, the Hurons compiled a 7–2 record (3–3 against IIAC opponents), tied with Central Michigan for the IIAC championship, and outscored their opponents, 138 to 70. Barry C. Basel was the team captain. The team's statistical leaders included Tom McCormick with 461 rushing yards and the same number of yards of total offense and Virgil Windom with seven touchdowns for 42 points. Virgil Windom received the team's most valuable player award.

Schedule

References

Michigan State Normal
Eastern Michigan Eagles football seasons
Michigan State Normal Hurons football